Dandruff is a skin condition that mainly affects the scalp. Symptoms include flaking and sometimes mild itchiness. It can result in social or self-esteem problems. A more severe form of the condition, which includes inflammation of the skin, is known as seborrhoeic dermatitis.

The cause is unclear, but believed to involve a number of genetic and environmental factors; the condition may worsen in the winter. It is not due to poor hygiene, and the underlying mechanism involves the excessive growth of skin cells. Diagnosis is based on symptoms.

There is no known cure for dandruff. Antifungal cream, such as ketoconazole, or salicylic acid may be used to try to improve the condition. Dandruff affects about half of adults, with males more often affected than females. In addition, people in all areas of the world are affected. Onset is usually at puberty, and it becomes less common after the age of 50.

Signs and symptoms
The main symptoms of dandruff are an itchy scalp and flakiness. Red and greasy patches of skin and a tingly feeling on the skin are also symptoms.

Causes 

The cause is unclear but believed to involve a number of genetic and environmental factors.

As the skin layers continually replace themselves, cells are pushed outward where they die and flake off.  For most individuals, these flakes of skin are too small to be visible.  However, certain conditions cause cell turnover to be unusually rapid, especially in the scalp. It is hypothesized that for people with dandruff, skin cells may mature and be shed in two to seven days, as opposed to around a month in people without dandruff.  The result is that dead skin cells are shed in large, oily clumps, which appear as white or grayish flakes on the scalp, skin and clothes.

According to one study, dandruff has been shown to be possibly the result of three factors:
 Skin oil, commonly referred to as sebum or sebaceous secretions
 The metabolic by-products of skin micro-organisms (most specifically Malassezia yeasts)
 Individual susceptibility and allergy sensitivity.

Microorganisms
Older literature cites the fungus Malassezia furfur (previously known as Pityrosporum ovale) as the cause of dandruff. While this species does occur naturally on the skin surface of people both with and without dandruff, in 2007, it was discovered that the responsible agent is a scalp specific fungus, Malassezia globosa, that metabolizes triglycerides present in sebum by the expression of lipase, resulting in a lipid byproduct: oleic acid. During dandruff, the levels of Malassezia increase by 1.5 to 2 times its normal level. Oleic acid penetrates the top layer of the epidermis, the stratum corneum, and evokes an inflammatory response in susceptible people which disturbs homeostasis and results in erratic cleavage of stratum corneum cells.

Seborrhoeic dermatitis 
In seborrhoeic dermatitis, redness and itching frequently occur around the folds of the nose and eyebrow areas, not just the scalp. Dry, thick, well-defined lesions consisting of large, silvery scales may be traced to the less common condition of scalp psoriasis. Inflammation can be characterized by redness, heat, pain or swelling, and can cause sensitivity.

Inflammation and extension of scaling outside the scalp exclude the diagnosis of dandruff from seborrhoeic dermatitis. However, many reports suggest a clear link between the two clinical entities - the mildest form of the clinical presentation of seborrhoeic dermatitis as dandruff, where the inflammation is minimal and remains subclinical.

Seasonal changes, stress, and immunosuppression seem to affect seborrheic dermatitis.

Mechanism 
Dandruff scale is a cluster of corneocytes, which have retained a large degree of cohesion with one another and detach as such from the surface of the stratum corneum. A corneocyte is a protein complex that is made of tiny threads of keratin in an organised matrix. The size and abundance of scales are heterogeneous from one site to another and over time. Parakeratotic cells often make up part of dandruff. Their numbers are related to the severity of the clinical manifestations, which may also be influenced by seborrhea.

Treatment 

Shampoos use a combination of special ingredients to control dandruff.

Antifungals 
Antifungal treatments including ketoconazole, zinc pyrithione and selenium disulfide have been found to be effective. Ketoconazole appears to have a longer duration of effect. Ketoconazole is a broad spectrum antimycotic agent that is active against Candida and M. furfur. Of all the antifungals of the imidazole class, ketoconazole has become the leading contender among treatment options because of its effectiveness in treating seborrheic dermatitis as well.

Ciclopirox (topical route) may also be used as an anti-dandruff agent. However, it is mostly sold as cream and its main use is for treating athlete's foot, jock itch, and ringworm.

Coal tar 
Coal tar causes the skin to shed dead cells from the top layer and slows skin cell growth.

Etymology
According to the Oxford English Dictionary, the word dandruff is first attested in 1545, but is still of unknown etymology.

References

External links 
 

Hairdressing
Human head and neck
Seborrheic dermatitis
Wikipedia medicine articles ready to translate